Chignolo Po is a comune (municipality) in the Province of Pavia in the Italian region Lombardy, located about 45 km southeast of Milan and about 25 km east of Pavia. As of 31 December 2004, it had a population of 3502 and an area of 23.1 km².

The municipality of Chignolo Po contains the frazioni (subdivisions, mainly villages and hamlets) Alberone, Lambrinia, and Bosco.

Chignolo Po borders the following municipalities: Badia Pavese, Miradolo Terme, Monticelli Pavese, Orio Litta, Rottofreno, San Colombano al Lambro, Santa Cristina e Bissone.

Demographic evolution

References

External links
 www.comune.chignolopo.pv.it

Cities and towns in Lombardy